The 1996 Missouri lieutenant gubernatorial election was held on November 5, 1996. Democratic incumbent Roger B. Wilson defeated Republican nominee Bill Kenney with 53.52% of the vote.

General election

Candidates
Major party candidates
Roger B. Wilson, Democratic
Bill Kenney, Republican

Other candidates
Jeanne Bojarski, Libertarian
Patricia A. Griffard, Natural Law

Results

References

1996
Missouri
Gubernatorial